Ilmari Kuokka (23 July 1901 – 17 January 1981) was a Finnish long-distance runner. He competed in the marathon at the 1928 Summer Olympics and finished 24th.

References

1901 births
1981 deaths
Finnish male long-distance runners
Athletes (track and field) at the 1928 Summer Olympics
Olympic athletes of Finland
People from Virolahti
Sportspeople from Kymenlaakso
20th-century Finnish people